The Africa Movie Academy Award for Best Actress in a Supporting Role is an annual merit by the Africa Film Academy to recognize and reward actresses in a supporting role in a film.

References

Lists of award winners
Film awards for supporting actress
Best Supporting Actress Africa Movie Academy Award winners
Africa Movie Academy Awards